Şirin Tekeli (28 February 1944, Ankara – 13 June 2017, Bodrum) was a feminist, academician, translator, writer, activist and one of the pioneers of second wave feminism in Turkey.

Career
In 1967, she returned to Turkey and became the first female academician to enter the Chair in political science at Istanbul University. In 1973 she obtained her PhD with a thesis on David Easton's System Theory. In 1978, she obtained her associate professor title with her, at the time "controversial", habilitation thesis on women’s participation to politics named "Kadınlar ve Siyasal Toplumsal Hayat". (Women and Political Social Life). This thesis, had a great effect on her ideology, she recalls :

"I was a "timid feminist" but by the time I finished it I saw clearly that women were being oppressed, exploited and excluded from the public sphere. It was not capitalism that was doing this, it was male dominance".

After her thesis, she started working on elections. She returned to France and spent the academic year 1979–1980 at the Scientific Research National Center (Centre National de la Recherche Scientifique) (CNRS) with a scholarship, learning cartography. She, during this period, formed a computer database, with all the data concerning the elections in Turkey, and studied the sociology of elections in urban areas with Jean Ranger and his team. In 1980-81 she organized a seminar on the sociology of politics

Activism
After she left academia, she  began an active role in the feminist movement of Turkey. Seeing the 80s as the "years of action", she dedicated herself to ameliorate women's situation and raise awareness in Turkey via campaigns and protests. In the 90s, "the years of institutionalisation", as she calls them, have started: Tekeli focused on creating associations and foundations.

Years of action
Following Turkey’s decision on not changing the civic law in accordance with the Convention on the Elimination of All Forms of Discrimination Against Women(CEDAW), in 1986 she took part in a petition demanding changes in the constitution, laws and practice, in accordance with the contract.

On 17 May 1987, she participated to the first legal protest after the military coup, and demanded an end to domestic violence.

Awards
In 1996, she was awarded with Ordre des Palmes Académiques by the Cultural Ministry of France.

Personal life and death
Şirin Tekeli was married to lawyer Ahmet Tekeli, with whom she met while studying at University of Lausanne. Her marriage lasted until 2010, when Ahmet Tekeli died. For his memory, Şirin Tekeli  used the assets he left to her to found the Şirin-Ahmet Tekeli Association for Supporting Women Lawyers

In 2017, Sabancı University Gender and the Women's Studies Center began granting a research award in memory of Şirin Tekeli: "The Şirin Tekeli Research Award''". This award was created to support and promote research focusing on gender in Turkey.

References

1944 births
2017 deaths
20th-century Turkish women writers
20th-century Turkish writers
21st-century Turkish women writers
Officiers of the Ordre des Palmes Académiques
recipients of the Ordre des Palmes Académiques
Academic staff of Istanbul University
Turkish activists
Turkish feminist writers
Turkish women's rights activists
University of Lausanne alumni